John B. Terry (January 18, 1796 – January 11, 1874) was an American pioneer, merchant, soldier, and territorial legislator.

Born in Coxsackie, New York, Terry served in the United States Army during the War of 1812. He moved to St. Charles, Missouri where he was a merchant and then to Sangamon County, Illinois. In 1829, Terry moved to Michigan Territory and settled in Mineral Point where he was a merchant and smelter. Terry served as a captain in the Black Hawk War of 1832. From 1836 to 1838, Terry served in the Wisconsin Territorial Council of the Wisconsin Territorial Legislature. He died in Mineral Point, Wisconsin.

Notes

1796 births
1874 deaths
People from Coxsackie, New York
People from Mineral Point, Wisconsin
People from St. Charles, Missouri
People from Sangamon County, Illinois
Businesspeople from Illinois
Businesspeople from Missouri
Businesspeople from Wisconsin
American people of the Black Hawk War
People from New York (state) in the War of 1812
Members of the Wisconsin Territorial Legislature
19th-century American politicians
19th-century American businesspeople